Si Thep may refer to:

 Si Thep Historical Park, an archaeological site in Thailand covering the ancient city of Si Thep
 Si Thep district, the modern district (amphoe) surrounding the site